The 2018–19 Big East Conference men's basketball season began with practices in October 2018, followed by the start of the 2018–19 NCAA Division I men's basketball season in November. This season marked the 40th year in the conference's history, but the sixth as a non-football conference, which officially formed on July 1, 2013. Conference play began in December 2018.

The 2019 Big East men's basketball tournament was held at Madison Square Garden in New York from March 13 through March 17, 2019. Villanova defeated  Seton Hall to win the tournament championship and receive the conference's automatic bid to the NCAA tournament.

Four Big East schools received bids to the NCAA Tournament (Marquette, Seton Hall, St. John's, and Villanova). Villanova was the only team to make it out the Round of 64 before losing to Purdue in the Round of 32.

Five Big East schools received bids to the National Invitation Tournament (Creighton, Xavier, Georgetown, Providence, and Butler) with only Creighton and Xavier advancing past the 1st Round, with the Bluejays making to the Quarterfinals before losing to TCU.

Marquette guard Markus Howard was named the Big East Player of the Year after leading the Big East in scoring with 25.0 PPG. Georgetown freshman guard James Akinjo was named Big East Freshman of the Year. Villanova head coach Jay Wright was named Big East coach of the year for the sixth time.

Head coaches

Coaching changes 
On March 27, 2018, Chris Mack was hired as the new head coach of Louisville, leaving Xavier after nine seasons. Four days later, longtime assistant coach Travis Steele was named the new head coach of the Musketeers.

Coaches 

Notes: 
 Years at school includes 2018–19 season.
 Overall and Big East records are from time at current school and are through the end of the 2018–19 season. 
 McDermott's MVC conference records not included since team began play in Big East.

Preseason

Preseason poll 
Prior to the season, the Big East conducted a poll of Big East coaches, coaches do not place their own team on their ballots.

Preseason All-Big East teams
Source

Regular season

Rankings

Conference matrix
This table summarizes the head-to-head results between teams in conference play.

Player of the week
Throughout the season, the Big East Conference named a player of the week and a freshman of the week each Monday.

Honors and awards

All-Americans

To earn "consensus" status, a player must win honors based on a point system computed from the four different all-America teams. The point system consists of three points for first team, two points for second team and one point for third team. No honorable mention or fourth team or lower are used in the computation. The top five totals plus ties are first team and the next five plus ties are second team.

Big East Awards

Postseason

2019 Big East tournament

Bracket

*Indicates number of overtime periods.

2019 NCAA tournament

2019 NIT

2019 CBI

References

External links
Big East website